Dauda Sulaiman Kamara is a Sierra Leonean politician.  Kamara was selected to be Internal Affairs Minister under President Ernest Bai Koroma.  He is a member of the All People's Congress from the Kambia District, one of only 3 APC Members of Parliament from that district.  He is a member of the Parliament of Sierra Leone as well as the Pan-African Parliament.

Sources 

 List of members of parliament by district Sierra-Leone.org

Dauda Kamara served as former ambassador of Sierra Leone to the United States and is very well known throughout Sierra Leone for his philanthropic ways.

Year of birth missing (living people)
Living people
Members of the Pan-African Parliament from Sierra Leone
Members of the Parliament of Sierra Leone
Temne people
Government ministers of Sierra Leone
All People's Congress politicians
Ambassadors of Sierra Leone to the United States